Akwasi Andrews Jones Amoako Atta Ofori Atta (7 December 1937 – 30 November 2020) was a Ghanaian economist and politician. He was an academic in economics at the University of Ghana and served as ministerial secretary (deputy minister) for Finance and Economic Planning in the Busia government.

Early life and education
Jones was born on 7 December 1937 at Fankyeneko in the Eastern region to Nana Sir Ofori Atta I; the Omanhene of Akyem Abuakwa between 1912 and 1943.
He had his early education at the Kibi Government School from 1943 to 1950 and his secondary education at Achimota School from 1950 to 1957. He proceeded to the University of Ghana from 1958 to 1961. He left for Canada to study at the University of Ottawa in 1962. He was awarded his doctorate degree in 1965.

Career
He joined the faculty of the University of Manitoba, Winnipeg as an assistant professor in Economics from 1965 to 1966. He was also a visiting lecturer at the University of Manchester from 1966 to 1967. In 1967, he was appointed a lecturer in economics at
the University of Ghana. In 1969 he left his teaching post at the university to contest for political office. He returned to the University of Ghana after the fall of the second republic and went on to become the Dean of the Faculty of Social Sciences.

Politics
In 1969, he was elected a member of parliament for the Begoro constituency on the ticket of the Progress Party. He contested the seat with Edward R. Dampare of the National Alliance of Liberals and Prince Condua of the United Nationalist Party. That same year, he was appointed ministerial secretary (deputy minister) for the Ministry of Finance and Economic Planning by the then prime minister Kofi Abrefa Busia. He held this appointment until 1972 when the Busia government was overthrown by the Supreme Military Council.

At the inception of the Third Republic, he was elected as a member of parliament for the Begoro constituency for a second time on the ticket of the Popular Front Party; an offshoot of the erstwhile Progress Party. While in parliament, he also served as the opposition spokesman on finance and economic planning. He served in these roles from 1979 until 1981 when the Limann government was overthrown.

In 1992, he stood for the seat of the Fanteakwa constituency on the ticket of the New Patriotic Party. He lost the seat to K. Amfo of the National Democratic Congress in a controversial contest in which results of the contest were disputed by the New Patriotic Party and the National Democratic Congress.

In 1996, he was one of the presidential aspirants for the New Patriotic Party. In 1997, he decided to quit active politics even though he remained a member of the New Patriotic Party.

Personal life
He was married to Maud Adi-Darko, with whom he had four children. He was the father of Ken Ofori-Atta, the current Minister of Finance. His hobbies were reading and writing.

Death 
Ofori-Atta died on 30 November 2020.

See also
 List of MPs elected in the 1969 Ghanaian parliamentary election
 Busia government
 Ofori-Atta

References

1937 births
Akan people
Alumni of Achimota School
Ghanaian MPs 1969–1972
Ghanaian MPs 1979–1981
Progress Party (Ghana) politicians
20th-century Ghanaian politicians
Ghanaian Presbyterians
Ghanaian Protestants
Ofori-Atta family
University of Ghana alumni
University of Ottawa alumni
2020 deaths